The 2020 Russian Men's Curling Cup was held from October 6 to 12, 2020 at the Palace of Figure Skating and Curling in Dmitrov, Moscow Oblast.

All games played are 8 ends.

All times are listed in Moscow Time (UTC+03:00)

Teams

Round-robin standings
Final round-robin standings

Round-robin results

Group A

Group B

Points: 2 for win, 1 for loss, 0 for technical loss (did not start)

Playoffs

Semifinals
Sunday, October 11, 7:20 pm

Third place game
Monday, October 12, 10:00 am

Final
Monday, October 12, 10:00 am

Final standings

References

External links
 (web archive)
2020 Russian Men's Curling Cup - Curlingzone

See also
2020 Russian Women's Curling Cup

Russian Men's Curling Cup
Russian Men's Curling Cup
Russian Men's Curling Cup
Sport in Moscow Oblast